The Mugger is a 1958 film noir-crime film about a police psychiatrist who is attempting to catch a mysterious mugger that has been attacking women in his city, stealing their purses and slashing their left cheek. The film is a police procedural in structure, focusing on psychiatrist Dr. Pete Graham's investigation into the title character's identity.

The film's screenplay, written by Henry Kane, is based on the novel of the same name by Evan Hunter (writing under the pen name Ed McBain). William Berke directed the film, the second of two adaptions of Hunter's 87th Precinct novels he released in 1958 (following Cop Hater). It was Berke's final completed film as a director; he died the same year.

It was filmed in Bay Ridge, Brooklyn, New York. Several of the car scenes were filmed on the Belt Parkway. The Veterans Hospital located on the Fort Hamilton Army Base with no Verazzano Bridge can be seen during the first car scene. The restaurant scene was filmed on 67th Street and 4th Avenue right next to the subway exit. Other Bay Ridge locations can be seen throughout the film as well.

Plot

Cast
Kent Smith as Dr. Pete Graham
Nan Martin as Claire Townsend
James Franciscus as Eddie Baxter
Stefan Schnabel as Fats Donner
Dick O'Neill as Cassidy
Leonard Stone as Jim Kelly
Sandra Church as Jeannie Page
John Alexander as Chief of Police
Arthur Storch as Jack "Skippy" Randolph

References

External links
 

1958 films
Film noir
1958 crime drama films
American black-and-white films
American crime drama films
1950s English-language films
Films directed by William A. Berke
Films scored by Albert Glasser
Films shot in New York City
1950s police procedural films
United Artists films
Films based on novels by Ed McBain
1950s American films